Roy Ellam (born 13 January 1943) is an English former professional footballer who played as a centre half in the Football League for three West Yorkshire teams, Bradford City, Huddersfield Town and Leeds United, during the 1960s and 1970s.

Born in Hemsworth, Ellam started his career at Bradford City before joining Huddersfield Town, then Leeds United, before returning to Huddersfield. Leeds won the First Division during his time at the club but he only contributed 4 appearances during the campaign. He then played in the North American Soccer League for Philadelphia Atoms and Washington Diplomats before returning to non-league football in England with Mossley, where he scored twice in 83 appearances, and Gainsborough Trinity, where he was manager. From 1983 to 1992 Roy ran the Nelson Inn public house in Thornhill Lees near Dewsbury,  and worked in his daughter's fitness centre.

References

External links
 

1943 births
Living people
People from Hemsworth
English footballers
Association football defenders
Bradford City A.F.C. players
Huddersfield Town A.F.C. players
Leeds United F.C. players
Philadelphia Atoms players
Washington Diplomats (NASL) players
Mossley A.F.C. players
Gainsborough Trinity F.C. players
Gainsborough Trinity F.C. managers
English Football League players
North American Soccer League (1968–1984) players
English football managers
English expatriate sportspeople in the United States
Expatriate soccer players in the United States
English expatriate footballers